Jang Media Group, also known as Geo Group, is a Pakistani media conglomerate and a subsidiary of Dubai-based company Independent Media Corporation. Its headquarters is in Printing House, Karachi, Pakistan. It is Pakistan's largest group of newspapers and the publisher of the Urdu language newspaper the Daily Jang., The News International, Mag Weekly, Geo News and Geo TV Network. 

Mir Khalil-ur-Rahman (1927–1992) was the founder chairman and editor of Jang Group of Newspapers. Mir Shakil-ur-Rahman is the current head of the business house based in Karachi. He is the CEO of Jang Group of Newspapers and also holds the title of Editor-in-Chief.

Background and major shareholders 
Mir Khalil ur Rehman, a businessman of Kashmiri descent, founded the Jang Group at the end of World War II. As of 2011, his eldest son, Mir Javed ur Rehman, is the Group Chairman and the Executive Director. Javed's younger brother Mir Shakil-ur-Rahman is Group Chief Executive and Editor in Chief. Independent Media Corporation is a multi-media corporation and owns the Jang Group of Newspapers and the Geo Television  Network based in Karachi, Pakistan. Mir Ibrahim Rahman is the Chief Executive of Geo Television Network and the President was Imran Aslam.

Newspapers and magazines
 Daily Jang - original flagship newspaper of the Group in the Urdu language. Group Editor: Mehmood Sham in Karachi. Newspaper editions are issued in Karachi, Lahore, Rawalpindi, Quetta, Multan and London, with the largest daily circulation in Pakistan among Urdu newspapers
 The News International - daily newspaper in English started in 1991
 Akhbar-e-Jahan - a weekly magazine in Urdu started in 1967
 MAG - a weekly magazine in English
 Daily Awam
 Daily News
 Aftab
 Inquilab
 Waqt
 Kaisa Hoga, an annual publication in partnership with The Economist

TV channels 
It also runs many TV channels as part of the Geo Television Network starting with its flagship channel Geo TV in 2002. It has since launched several other channels in which the news, music and sports sectors are targeted. Their broadcast channel services are provided to the viewers in the UK, the US, Canada, and the Middle East as well as in Pakistan.
 Geo News - a Pakistan-based Urdu news channel
 AAG TV - launched in September 2006 by the Geo Network, focusing on programs for youth in Pakistan. 
 GEO Super - (sports channel), launched by Geo Network in September 2006. Programming content includes a variety of sports from around the world, focusing mainly on cricket and field hockey with a secondary focus on boxing, football (soccer), and tennis.
 Geo Entertainment - a Pakistan based entertainment channel showing drama serials, musical programs, feature movies, primarily in Urdu.
 Geo Tez - a Pakistan based news channel, broadcasting news headlines in every fifteen minutes.
 Geo Kahani - a Pakistan-based channel devoted exclusively to drama serials

Companies
 Geo A&B Productions
 United News Network
 Independent Motion Pictures
 Pakistan Ink and Packaging Industries
 khudi ventures

Broadcasting
The following broadcasting companies are owned by the Jang Group.
 Independent Media Corporation (Private) Limited
 Clarity Communications (Private) Limited
 Interlink Multimedia (Private) Limited
 Independent Music Group (Private) Limited
 Cross Currents (Private) Limited
 Geo Entertainment Media Holding (Private) Limited
 Geo Entertainment Television (Private) Limited

References

External links
 Official website for Daily Jang an Urdu language daily newspaper, Weekly Akhbar-e-Jehan magazine in Urdu language, Mag - The Weekly in English language
 Daily Jang English

Newspaper companies of Pakistan
Mass media in Karachi
Companies based in Karachi
Mass media companies of Pakistan
Newspapers published in Pakistan